Cuautitlán de García Barragán is a town and municipality in Jalisco in central-western Mexico. The municipality covers an area of  1178.67 km².

As of 2005, the municipality had a total population of 16,408.

References

Municipalities of Jalisco